Hacketts Gully is a suburb of Perth, Western Australia, located within the City of Kalamunda. It was officially named in 1972 and commemorates an early settler and market gardener, Thomas Hackett.

References

External links

Suburbs of Perth, Western Australia
Suburbs in the City of Kalamunda